GPRA may refer to:

Government Performance and Results Act
Provisional Government of the Algerian Republic